Villacher Alpenarena is a ski jumping hill in Villach, Austria.

History
It was opened in 1937 and owned by SV Villach. It hosted six FIS Ski jumping World Cup individual events and one team event. Michael Hayböck holds the hill record. There are also K-15, K-30 and K-60 hills.

References

Ski jumping venues in Austria
Sport in Austria
Sports venues completed in 1937